Ming Xi or Xi Mengyao (born 18 March 1989) is a Chinese model. Her professional modeling career started in 2009 after she attended a TV competition. Her international modeling career began in 2011 when she debuted for the Givenchy Haute Spring Show. In the same year, she modeled the Givenchy ready-to-wear collection and appeared as the face of Givenchy's Fall/Winter publicity advertising campaign. Xi also modeled for the Victoria's Secret Fashion Show in 2013.

Career
In 2008, Xi attended a television competition on Dragon Television called Go! Oriental Angels. This was her first notable appearance on television.

Two years after she graduated from college, Xi participated in the Elite Model Look competition, a fashion modeling event held by Elite Model Management. Xi ranked third in the competition. Shortly after the contest, she was offered a contract with Givenchy, and debuted at the Givenchy Haute Couture Show and ready-to-wear shows. She started her international modeling career shortly after in the same year, when she appeared in the Givenchy F/W 2010 campaign, shot by Mert Alas and Marcus Piggott. Xi also took part in the Fall/ Winter 2011 New York Fashion Week with other three Chinese fashion models: Shu Pei, Sun Feifei, and Liu Wen.

Xi modeled the Victoria's Secret Fashion Show in 2013, 2014, 2015, 2016, 2017 and 2018. In 2014, Michael Kors invited Xi to model his Michael Kors Shanghai Extravaganza with Rosie Huntington-Whiteley and Miranda Kerr. Xi also participated in the Met Gala red carpet with Kors and Huntington-Whiteley. In 2015, Olivier Rousteing, creative director of Balmain, invited Xi to model the Balmain 2015 Fall runway along with Alessandra Ambrosio, Adriana Lima, Constance Jablonski, Taylor Hill, Joan Smalls, Cindy Bruna, Jourdan Dunn, Karlie Kloss, Magdalena Frąckowiak, Devon Windsor, and Lily Donaldson. In 2015, Karl Lagerfeld selected Xi to star in a new campaign for his label, and cooperated with Kendall Jenner and Sasha Luss.

Personal life 
In July 2019, Xi married Mario Ho, son of Hong Kong-Macau magnate Stanley Ho, after an engagement ceremony in May earlier in the year. She gave birth to a son named Ronaldo in October 2019.

References

External links

1989 births
Living people
Chinese female models
People from Shanghai
The Lions (agency) models
Ho family
Elite Model Management models